Wen-Ch'ing (Winnie) Li (born December 25, 1948) is a Taiwanese-American mathematician and a Distinguished Professor of Mathematics at Pennsylvania State University. She is a number theorist, with research focusing on the theory of automorphic forms and applications of number theory to coding theory and spectral graph theory. In particular, she has applied her research results in automorphic forms and number theory to construct efficient communication networks called Ramanujan graphs and Ramanujan complexes.

Professional career
Li did her undergraduate studies at National Taiwan University, graduating in 1970; at NTU, she was a classmate of other notable female mathematicians Fan Chung, Sun-Yung Alice Chang and Jang-Mei Wu. She earned a doctorate from the University of California, Berkeley in 1974, under the supervision of Andrew Ogg. Before joining the PSU faculty in 1979, she was a Benjamin Pierce assistant professor at Harvard University for 3.5 years from 1974 to 1977, and a tenure-track assistant professor at the University of Illinois at Chicago from 1978 to 1979. She was also the director of the National Center of Theoretical Sciences in Taiwan from 2009 to 2014.

Awards and honors
In 2010, Li was the winner of the Chern Prize, given every three years to an outstanding Chinese mathematician. In 2012 she became a fellow of the American Mathematical Society. She was chosen to give the 2015 Noether Lecture.

References

External links
Home page

1948 births
Living people
20th-century American mathematicians
21st-century American mathematicians
20th-century Taiwanese mathematicians
American women mathematicians
National Taiwan University alumni
University of Illinois Chicago faculty
Harvard University faculty
Pennsylvania State University faculty
Fellows of the American Mathematical Society
American people of Taiwanese descent
American academics of Chinese descent
20th-century women mathematicians
21st-century women mathematicians
21st-century American women scientists